Kara, or Regi, is a Bantu language of Tanzania, spoken off Ukerewe Island in Lake Victoria. Jita–Kara–Kwaya are close to being dialects.

References

Languages of Tanzania
Great Lakes Bantu languages